Bryant Elementary School is the name of a number of elementary schools, including:

Bryant Elementary School (Dubuque, Iowa)
Bryant Elementary School (Long Beach, California)
Bryant Elementary School (Independence, Missouri)
Bryant Elementary School (Philadelphia, Pennsylvania)
Bryant Elementary School (Tacoma, Washington)
Bryant Elementary School (Seattle, Washington)
Bryant Elementary School K-6 (Arlington, Texas)
Bryant Elementary School K-6 (Moore, Oklahoma)
Bryant Elementary School K-5 (Sioux City, Iowa)
Bryant Elementary School (Ann Arbor, Michigan)
Bryant Elementary School K-6 (Wichita, Kansas)
Bryant Elementary School (Prosper, Texas)